William Merriam Burton (November 17, 1865 – December 29, 1954) was an American chemist who developed a widely used thermal cracking process for crude oil.

Burton was born in Cleveland, Ohio.  In 1886, he received a Bachelor of Science degree at Western Reserve University.  He earned a PhD at Johns Hopkins University in 1889.

Burton initially worked for the Standard Oil refinery at Whiting, Indiana.  He became president of Standard Oil from 1918 to 1927, when he retired.

The process of thermal cracking invented by Burton, which became  on January 7, 1913, doubled the yield of gasoline that can be extracted from crude oil.

The first thermal cracking method, the Shukhov cracking process, was invented by Russian engineer Vladimir Shukhov (1853-1939), in the Russian empire, Patent No. 12926, November 27, 1891.
Burton died  in Miami, Florida.

See also
Cracking (chemistry)
Burton process
Shukhov cracking process

References

External links
 Information on cracking in oil refining

1865 births
1954 deaths
American chemists
American energy industry businesspeople
People in the petroleum industry
Oil refining
American chemical engineers
Scientists from Cleveland
People from Whiting, Indiana
Engineers from Ohio